Massimo Trevisan (born 20 January 1968) is an Italian former freestyle swimmer who competed in the 1988 Summer Olympics and in the 1992 Summer Olympics.

References

1968 births
Living people
People from Cinisello Balsamo
Italian male freestyle swimmers
Olympic swimmers of Italy
Swimmers at the 1988 Summer Olympics
Swimmers at the 1992 Summer Olympics
European Aquatics Championships medalists in swimming
Mediterranean Games gold medalists for Italy
Mediterranean Games medalists in swimming
Swimmers at the 1987 Mediterranean Games
Swimmers of Centro Sportivo Carabinieri
Swimmers at the 1979 Mediterranean Games
Sportspeople from the Metropolitan City of Milan